Louis Grenville Abell (July 21, 1884 – October 25, 1962) was an American rower who competed in the 1900 Summer Olympics and in the 1904 Summer Olympics.

In 1900, he was the coxswain of the American boat Vesper Boat Club, which won the gold medal in the men's eight. Four years later, he won his second gold medal as coxswain of the American boat in the eight. After his retirement from sports, he served on the board of health in his hometown of Elizabeth, New Jersey for 40 years.

References

External links

1884 births
1962 deaths
Sportspeople from Elizabeth, New Jersey
Coxswains (rowing)
Rowers at the 1900 Summer Olympics
Rowers at the 1904 Summer Olympics
Olympic gold medalists for the United States in rowing
American male rowers
Medalists at the 1904 Summer Olympics
Medalists at the 1900 Summer Olympics